The Sukow or Sukow-Dziedzice group or Sukow-Dziedzice culture, also known as Szeligi culture, was an archaeological culture attributed to the Early Slavs. Areal of sites lays between Elbe and Vistula rivers in Northeast Germany and North West Poland. The earliest sites date to the second half of 7th and mid-8th centuries.

There exist different views on its origin. It has features of both Przeworsk culture and Prague-Korchak culture. In comparison to Carpathian Slavic-speaking population of Korchak-Mogilany-type some consider Sukow-Dziedzice's had different population, maybe indigenous to Poland or arrived from within Poland and Belarus or a mixture of Korchak Slavs and indigenous post-Przeworsk population. M. Kazanski identified the 6th-century Prague-Korchak culture and later Sukow-Dziedzice group as Sclaveni archaeological cultures, and the Penkovka culture (Prague-Penkovka) with Antes.

Most recent studies, based on dendrochronological evidence, conclude there is little evidence of a Slavic presence in Polabia or Central and Northwestern Poland before the end of the 7th or the early 8th century. There was only sparse settlement till the 9th century.

Later stages 
The old theory mainly represented by Joachim Herrmann, who argued 7th century second wave immigration origin of later archaeological groups which replaced Sukow, is rejected by now. In that period only arrived first Slavic people of Sukow culture who didn't build yet strongholds.

 Feldberg-type, also known as Feldberg-Kędrzyny or Feldberger-Gołańcz-Kędrzyny in Poland, appeared  mainly in Pomerania and Mecklenburg, but also Little Poland and Southern Silesia, from mid-8th to late 9th century but in some parts was preserved until 9-10th century. Based on data collected, L. R. Lozny in 2013 considered that a minor percentage already appeared in the end of 7th and early 8th century.

 Menkendorf-type, also known as Menkendorf-Szczecin in Poland, followed Feldberg-type from late 8th or early 9th until the end of 10th century.

See also 
 Leipzig group
 Tornow group

References

Sources

 Barford, M. Paul (2001). The Early Slavs: Culture and Society in Early Medieval Eastern Europe. Cornell University Press. ISBN 9780801439773
 Biermann, Felix (2011). "Functions of the Large Feldberg Type Strongholds from the 8th/9th Century in Mecklenburg and Pomerania". Sprawozdania Archeologiczne (63), pp. 149–173
 Brather, Sebastian (2004). "The beginnings of Slavic settlement east of the river Elbe". Antiquity, Volume 78, Issue 300. pp. 314–329
 Brather, S. (2001; 2nd ed. 2008). Archäologie der westlichen Slawen: Siedlung, Wirtschaft und Gesellschaft im früh- und hochmittelalterlichen Ostmitteleuropa. Walter de Gruyter. ISBN 9783110206098
 Brather, S., Marek Dulinicz (2005). "Slawische Keramik. Elbslawen" in Germanische Altertumskunde Online. Volume 29. Walter de Gruyer, pp. 79–88. ISBN 3110183609
 
 
 
 
Lozny, R. Ludomir (2013). Prestate Societies of the North Central European Plains: 600-900 CE. Springer. ISBN 9781461468158

Further reading

 Brather, Sebastian (1995). "Nordwestslawische Siedlungskeramik der Karolingerzeit - Fränkische Waren als Vorbild?". Germania. Vol 73 (2), pp. 403–420
 Brather, Sebastian (1996). Feldberger Keramik und frühe Slawen: Studien zur nordwestslawischen Keramik der Karolingerzeit. Habelt. ISBN 9783774927681
Sikora, J., 2007. Polska Centralna we wczesnym średniowieczu w świetle badań archeologicznych i osadniczych. Slavia Antiqua: rocznik poświęcony starożytnościom słowiańskim, (48), pp.125-160.
Parczewski, M., 1988. Najstarsza faza kultury wczesnosłowiańskiej w Polsce (No. 141). Nakł. Uniwersytetu Jagiellońskiego.
Wachowski, K., 2001. Elementy rodzime i obce w uzbrojeniu wczesnośredniowiecznym na Śląsku.
Rogalski, B. and Messal, S., 2012. Frühe Slawen im Pyritzer Land. Erste Ergebnisse eines interdisziplinären Forschungsvorhabens. Materiały Zachodniopomorskie, 9, pp.127-206.
Gruszka, B., Łuczak, A., Forysiak, J., Twardy, J., Gunia, P. and Milecka, K., 2015. Osada z VII i początku VIII wieku w Mozowie, stan. 23, woj. lubuskie. Źródła archeologiczne i środowiskowe.
Messal, S. and Rogalski, B., 2013. Early Slavs in the Southwest. Baltic Region: Initial. Investigations in Dobropole. Pyrzyckie (Poland). Archaeologia Baltica, 17, pp.80-90.
Lozny, L.R., 2017. Societal Dynamics of Prestate Societies of the North Central European Plains, 500–1000 CE: A Model. In Feast, Famine or Fighting? (pp. 35-59). Springer, Cham.

Archaeological cultures of Central Europe
Archaeological cultures of Eastern Europe
Slavic archaeological cultures
Early medieval archaeological cultures of Europe
Archaeological cultures in Germany
Archaeological cultures in Poland